Upton House is a country house in the civil parish of Ratley and Upton, in the English county of Warwickshire, about  northwest of Banbury, Oxfordshire. It is in the care of the National Trust.

History 
The house was built on the site of the hamlet of Upton, which was destroyed in about 1500 when the land was cleared for pasture.
The estate passed through various hands until the early 16th century when it was bought by Sir William Danvers. It remained with the Danvers family until 1688 when Sir Rushout Cullen purchased the estate for £7,000 (equivalent to £ in ). Cullen built the house for himself in about 1695.

In 1757 the house was bought by banker Francis Child for use as a hunting lodge and it remained in the Jersey family until the end of the 19th century when it was held by George Child Villiers, 5th Earl of Jersey. In 1897, the estate was bought by brewer Andrew Richard Motion, grandfather of the writer Andrew Motion. In 1927 the estate was acquired by Walter Samuel, 2nd Viscount Bearsted, who owed his fortune to the fact that his father Marcus Samuel was the founder of the oil company Shell Transport & Trading. His wife Lady Bearsted worked with "Kitty" Lloyd Jones to transform the house's garden during the early 1930s. Kitty would visit and send letters to Lady Bearstead about her gardens. The letters include lists of plants that Lady Bearstead would approve before the gardener, Mr Tidman, planted them. Kitty is credited today with the soft colours and strong colours of the gardens at Upton Houses. She takes particular credit for converting some marshland into the bog garden which she envisaged based around a natural spring in the garden.

Lord Bearsted donated the house, gardens and art collection to the National Trust in 1948.

Lord Bearsted's son, the 3rd Viscount, lived at Upton from 1948 until his death in 1986 and added to the gift to the National Trust the collection of fine porcelain. On the death of the 3rd Viscount, the furniture and other items on view in the rooms were offered to the nation by his daughter, Hon. Mrs. R. Waley-Cohen, through the "in lieu" system, on condition that they remain at Upton and on view to the public.

Mrs. Waley-Cohen continued to live in the house until 1988, when the family moved to another property on the estate. In October 1991, she offered for sale by public auction, a large number of items which were considered surplus to requirements. The sale, by Christie's, took place at the house, in a total of 1083 separate lots, and included pictures, furniture, porcelain, silver, objects and carpets.

Description 

Upton is a long low house built of local yellow ironstone. It was considerably expanded from 1927 to 1929 for the 2nd Viscount Bearsted by Morley Horder who retained the Carolean style appearance of the exterior while introducing some Art Deco elements in the interior, particularly in the bathroom for Lady Bearsted, where the walls are covered in aluminium leaf. The style of interiors at Upton has been described by art critic Osbert Lancaster as Curzon Street Baroque.

A main attraction of Upton is the garden. A lawn, with huge cedar trees, sweeps gently down from the house and below is an extensive terraced garden. The garden features a kitchen garden, a series of herbaceous borders and a large lake with water lilies in a small valley. The terracing, unseen from the house and on a first visit unsuspected, contains the National Collection of Aster. In use since the 12th century, the gardens were largely transformed by Kitty Lloyd-Jones for Lady Bearsted in the 1920s and 1930s, including the creation of a rare Bog Garden on the site of medieval fish ponds.

Art collection 

Perhaps uniquely among country houses owned by the National Trust, its significance lies principally in its art collection. The house is presented more as an art gallery than as a private home, although care has been taken to restore the house to how it looked in the 1930s. It contains a unique Art Deco bathroom and a collection of early Shell advertising posters, together with some of their original artwork, by such artists as Rex Whistler.

The collection was assembled by Lord Bearsted, helped by his being a Trustee of the National Gallery. Lord Bearsted's sister Nellie Inonides also became an avid collector. The collection at Upton includes English and Continental old masters: Tiepolo, Anthony Devis, Francesco Guardi, Jan Steen, Melchior d'Hondecoeter, Thomas Gainsborough, Joshua Reynolds, Tintoretto and Rogier van der Weyden.

Highlights of the collection include:
The Duet or "Le corset blue" (mid-1660s) by Gabriël Metsu
Self Portrait of the Artist Engraving (1783) by Richard Morton Paye
William Beckford (1782) by George Romney (purchased by 1st Viscount Bearstead in the mistaken belief it was Beckford's father)
The Interior of the Church of St. Catherine, Utrecht (1655–1660) by Pieter Jansz. Saenredam
Martin Rize (1612) by Frans Pourbus the Younger
Adoration of the Kings (c. 1495), a triptych by a follower of Hieronymous Bosch (version of the original held by Museo del Prado in Madrid)
Bacino di San Marco, Venice (c. 1725–26) by Canaletto
The Death of the Virgin (1564) (grisaille) by Pieter Bruegel the Elder
Morning and Night, two of the Four Times of the Day (c. 1736), by William Hogarth
The Labourers (1779), The Haymakers (1783) and The Reapers (1783) by George Stubbs
The Disrobing of Christ (El Espolio) by El Greco (c. 1579) (purchased by Viscount Bearstead in July 1938 for the sum of £5,000)
Massacre of the Innocents by Pieter Bruegel the Elder (c.1565): in 2014 an appeal was launched to raise funds to help conserve the painting.
There is also a collection of English fine porcelain, including Chelsea, Derby, Bow and Worcester, as well as some French Sèvres.

References

External links

Upton House at the National Trust
Upton House Garden - a Gardens Guide review

Art museums and galleries in Warwickshire
National Trust properties in Warwickshire
Country houses in Warwickshire
Gardens in Warwickshire
Grade II* listed buildings in Warwickshire
Historic house museums in Warwickshire
Articles containing video clips
Grade II* listed houses